Wehem is a 2022 Pakistani thriller drama television series that was produced by 
Moomal Entertainment. The series revolves around the mysterious happenings of an isolated and independent woman who pretends to be caring and sympathetic. The series features Savera Nadeem, Shamim Hilaly, Babar Ali, Kinza Hashmi and Zaviyar Nauman Ijaz in leading roles. The series first aired on Hum TV in the night programming line-up from 22 June 2022.

Plot 

Junaid and Eshal are cousins and in love with each other. Eshal's parents want to marry her with him but Junaid's mother Rukhsana has problems with Eshal's father, Khawar. Years ago, Rukhsana's husband Anwar had gone to Dubai and never returned and she thinks Khawar is responsible for it as he didn't try to find him.

Cast 

 Savera Nadeem as Rukhsana Anwar née Saleem
 Shamim Hilaly as Amma Bi
 Babar Ali as Khawar Amin
 Kinza Hashmi as Eshal Khawar
 Zaviyar Nauman Ijaz as Junaid
 Fawad Jalal as Anwar Amin
 Adnan Samad Khan as Fareed
 Hurriya Mansoor as Saira
 Tara Mahmood as Sabahat 
 Hajra Khan as Naseem
 Syeda Hurain as Faiza

Soundtrack 
The official soundtrack of the series was sung by Zeb Bangash, music was composed by Ahmed Jahanzeb and lyrics were penned by Sabir Zafar.

Production 
The series is written by Imran Nazir. Adnan Wai Qureshi who also direct Neelum Kinaray and Aashti directed the series while Moomal Shunaid produced it under her banner Moomal Productions.

The principal photography majorly took place in a house, located near Shri Swaminarayan Mandir, Karachi.

Reception

Critical reception 
In a review by The News, the newspaper praised the teasers stating that it has created a peculiar and mysterious atmosphere. While reviewing the first episode, a reviewer from The News gave a positive review and praised the performances of the lead cast especially of Nadeem and Hilaly. Youline Magazine praised the acting performances of Hashmi, Ali and Hilaly and particularly the Nadeem's performance, but criticised the dragging story.

References

External links 

 Official website

2022 Pakistani television series debuts
Pakistani drama television series
Urdu-language television shows